Jiamusi (formerly Kiamusze) is a prefecture-level city in eastern Heilongjiang province, People's Republic of China. Located along the middle and lower reaches of the Songhua River, it faces Russia's Khabarovsk Krai across the Ussuri River and the Heilongjiang. In 2018, Jiamusi had a GDP of RMB 101.2 billion with a 4.3% growth rate. Its population was 2,156,505 at the 2020 census whom 862,555 lived in the built up area comprising 4 urban districts.

History

Early history
In 1720, Jiamusi was first named Giyamusi during the Kangxi period by the Nanai people. The word Giyamusi originally means "inn" in the Manchu language. Because of the harsh climate and short growing season, the region of modern day Jiamusi was largely uncultivated.
 
Since the Qing government opened Manchuria for farming in order to prevent the conquest of the area by Russia, Jiamusi developed as a small trading post under the name Dongxing since 1888. When Han Chinese and Manchu settlers began to move into the area, Jiamusi became the seat of a county administration, under the name Huachuan in 1910. However, the county seat was moved 30 miles to the north to Haoli (Hegang) after several destructive floods. After the Xinhai Revolution, as the Han Chinese continued to move in, the population of Jiamusi rose rapidly. Jiamusi continued to grow as a commercial center. As Jiamusi has become the largest harbor along the lower reaches of the Songhua River, a road system was constructed in order to provide convenient transport linking Jiamusi to several other important strongholds in northeastern China including Harbin and Nancha.

Japanese occupation period
As the Japanese invasion of Manchuria began, Jiamusi was established as an administrative centre of the puppet Manchukuo government. Jiamusi was regarded as an important military strongpoint to defend the Soviet Red Army's possible invasion. In 1937, the City of Jiamusi was established. It also became a major military base. Many settlers came into the area, not only from China but also from Korea and Japan, including the Development Group of Manchuria and Mongolia.
 After the construction of and Tumen-Jiamusi and Suihua-Jiamusi Railway continuously completed in 1937 and 1940, Jiamusi has become an agricultural products distribution center in Heilongjiang.

People's Republic
After 1949, as Jiamusi was still the transport and communications center of this region, the rapid development of Jiamusi continued. Industries including manufacturing agricultural equipment, mining machinery, fertilizers, plastics, and chemicals were developed. Since one of the biggest paper mills in China was built in 1957, Jiamusi has been a major producer of wood pulp and newsprint.  Because of being conveniently connected by air and water to Khabarovsk in the Russian Far East, Jiamusi is also an important harbour for international trade in northeastern China.

Geography

Jiamusi is located in eastern Heilongjiang province. Located at latitude 45° 56′−48° 28′ N and longitude 129° 29′−135° 05' E, containing China' easternmost point, although the urban area of Shuangyashan lies further to the east of Jiamusi. Neighbouring prefectures are:
Harbin (W)
Hegang (N)
Qitaihe (S)
Shuangyashan (E)
Yichun (W)
It also borders Russia's Khabarovsk Krai to the east. The confluence of the Amur, Songhua and Ussuri rivers meet in the east of the city. The Sanjiang Plain came into being because of the alluvion of these three large rivers.

Climate
Jiamusi has a monsoon-influenced humid continental climate (Köppen: Dwa), with long, bitter, but dry winters, and humid and very warm summers. Extreme temperatures have ranged from −41.1 °C to 38.1 °C.

Subdivisions

On July 26, 2006 Yonghong District was merged into Jiao District.

Sport
Five of the players in the national bandy team at their first World Championships came from Jiamusi. It's one of the cities in which China Bandy Federation explores the potential for further development.  The 13,000-capacity Jiamusi Stadium is located in the city. It opened in 2012 and it is used mainly for football.

Economy
Jiamusi has long been a major transit port and distribution center of goods, and serves as the economic hub of eastern Heilongjiang province. In 2011, Jiamusi's GDP paced up to RMB 62.53 billion representing a steady growth of 14.2% from a year earlier. In 2015, Jiamusi has a GDP of RMB 81.01 billion.

Jiamusi is an agricultural production hub in Heilongjiang Province. Value-added output from the agricultural sector increased 14.2% to RMB 18.92 billion in 2011. Crop production of the city rose 26.8% to 7.3 million tons. 
In 2011, gross industrial output from enterprises with designated size or above of the city surpassed RMB 39.34 billion, increased 35.5% year on year. Gross output from heavy industry amounted to RMB 22.77 billion, increasing by 38.7% compared with a year ago, while that from light industry reached RMB 16.57 billion, surging 31.4% from the previous year. Heavy industry and light industry made up 64% and 36% of the city's total gross industrial output.

Electricity production and supply, construction materials, chemicals and agricultural products processing are the pillar industries in the city. Major industrial products in the city include cement, edible oils, fertilizer and feed. The industrial sector in Jiamusi is relatively weak compared with other cities in Heilongjiang such as Harbin and Daqing. 
In 2011, the service sector became the largest contributor of the city, which gained value-added output of RMB 26.99 billion. This contributes 43.2% to Jiamusi's economy. With the  consumer market being very active, sales of consumer goods in Jiamusi amounted to RMB 24.55 billion in 2011, rising 18.2% year on year.

Foreign trade value increased 19.6% to RMB 3.65 billion in 2011. Export value was US$3.01 billion,  representing a rise of 6.1% over the previous year. while import value stood at US$640 million, increased 197.5% year on year. Russia is Jiamusi's largest foreign trade partner. In 2011, foreign trade with Russia amounted to US$900 million, increased 24.5% over the previous year, accounting for 24.66% of the city's foreign trade. The utilized FDI in Jiamusi hit US$150 million in 2011, increased 33.5% over the previous year.

Transportation

Railway
Jiamusi is a transportation hub in northeast Heilongjiang. Suijia (Suihua-Jiamusi) Railway and Tujia (Tumen-Jiamusi) Railway meet here.  Trains from Jiamusi Railway Station connect the city with Beijing, Jinan, Dalian, Harbin, Tianjin and several other cities in China. On September 30, 2018, the Harbin–Jiamusi intercity railway was opened to passenger traffic, which shortened the travel time between Jiamusi and Harbin from six hours to two and half hours.

Highway
Jiamusi is served by the G1011 Harbin-Tongjiang Expressway, the G11 Hegang-Dalian Expressway, as well as six other highways, forming a comprehensive highway network.

Air

Ports and waterways
First built in 1919, Jiamusi Port is a major port along the downstream of Songhua River. The port was expanded in 1937 and became a Steel-structured-port. However, The annual throughput of the port was less than 120 thousand tons per year until PRC's foundation in 1949. In 2014 the annual throughput was about 1 million tons per year. Available from mid-April until the beginning of November, passenger ships sail from Jiamusi up the Songhua River to Qiqihar, Harbin or downstream to Tongjiang and Khabarovsk in Russia.

Higher education
Jiamusi is home to Jiamusi University.

Twin towns

Domestic
 Kunshan, Jiangsu
 Zhangzhou, Fujian
 Chaoyang, Beijing
 Guangyuan, Sichuan
 Jingzhou, Hubei
 Huludao, Liaoning
 Jilin, Jilin

International 
  Nirasaki, Yamanashi Prefecture, Japan
  Komsomolsk-on-Amur, Khabarovsk Krai, Russia
  Shoalhaven, New South Wales, Australia
  Avellino, Italy
  Donghae, South Korea

References

External links

 Jiamusi Network 
 Jiamusi City Government

 
Cities in Heilongjiang
Prefecture-level divisions of Heilongjiang
Songhua River